Pisticci is a town comune in the province of Matera, in the Southern Italian region of Basilicata.
Pisticci is the fourth most populous town in the region and the most populous in the province after Matera. It is known for being the production site of Amaro Lucano, one of the most famous Italian liqueurs.

Saints Peter and Paul Mother Church

The church stands on the site of an early church which dated from 1212, retaining its bell tower and two of its stained glass windows. In 1542 it was expanded by the addition of two extra aisles, constructed by Pietro and Antonio Laviola, two brothers who were later accused of murder in Mantua.

The church is in the Romanesque-Renaissance style, with an angled roof, and is built in the shape of a Latin cross, with three aisles. On the left and right there are small chapels, under which there are buried local important people. Each chapel has a statue by the sculptor Salvatore Sacquegna. The interior walls of the church are decorated with 18th-century pictures painted by Domenico Guarino, among which Our Lady of Mount Carmel, the Madonna del Pozzo, and the Mysteries of the Rosary are especially notable.

References

Cities and towns in Basilicata